Sweden competed at the 2020 Winter Youth Olympics in Lausanne, Switzerland from 9 to 22 January 2020.

Medalists

Alpine skiing

Boys

Girls

Mixed

Biathlon

Boys

Girls

Mixed

Bobsleigh

Cross-country skiing

Boys

Girls

Curling

Mixed team

Mixed doubles

Freestyle skiing

Ski cross

Slopestyle and big air

Ice hockey

Tournaments
Summary

3x3 tournaments
Summary

Skeleton

Snowboarding

Slopestyle and big air

References

2020 in Swedish sport
Nations at the 2020 Winter Youth Olympics
Sweden at the Youth Olympics